I'm Sorry for You My Friend is the sixth album by country singer Moe Bandy, released in 1977 on the Columbia label recorded at Columbia Recording Studio "B".

The track "Does Fort Worth Ever Cross Your Mind" would later become a No. 1 hit for George Strait in 1984 for his album of the same name.

Track listing
"I'm Sorry For You, My Friend" (H. Williams) - 2:22
"Someone That I Can Forget" (L. Hargrove/P. Drake) - 2:28
"The Lady From The Country (Of Eleven Hundred Springs)" (J. Jay/B. Evans) - 2:08
"So Much For You, So Much For Me" (L. Anderson) - 2:23
"All The Beer And All My Friends Are Gone" (B. Anderson/M. L. Turner) - 2:39
"A Four Letter Fool" (K. Jean) - 2:20
"High Inflation Blues" (S. Collom) - 1:55
"Does Fort Worth Ever Cross Your Mind" (S. D. Shafer/D. Shafer) - 2:12
"She's An Angel" (H. Howard/L. J. Dillon) - 1:54
"She's Everybody's Woman, I'm Nobody's Man" (S. D. Shafer/M. Bandy) - 2:33

Musicians
Leo Jackson
Bob Moore
Kenny Malone
Johnny Gimble
Weldon Myrick
Hargus "Pig" Robbins
Charlie McCoy
Dave Kirby
Bobby Thompson
Ray Edenton
Jerry Carrigan
Henry Strzelecki
Leon Rhodes
Terry McMillan

Backing
The Jordanaires
The Nashville Edition

Production
Sound Engineer - Lou Bradley
Photography - Jim McGuire
Design - Bill Barnes, Cheryl Pardue

1977 albums
Moe Bandy albums
Columbia Records albums
Albums produced by Ray Baker (music producer)